C. nigricauda may refer to:
 Cladura nigricauda, Alexander, 1954, a crane fly species in the genus Cladura
 Cyclops nigricauda, Norman, 1869, a copepod species in the genus Cyclops

See also
 Nigricauda (disambiguation)